Sleptsov (feminine: Sleptsova) is a Russian-language surname derived from the nickname slepets, "blind man". The surname may refer to:

Vasily Sleptsov (1836-1878), Russian writer 
, former mayor of Voskresensk, Moscow Oblast, Russia 
 Platon Alekseevich Sleptsov, better known as Platon Oyunsky,  Soviet Yakut statesman, writer and translator, seen as one of the founders of modern Yakut literature
Svetlana Sleptsova,  Russian biathlete

Russian-language surnames